Brotherhood of Blood is a 2007 American-German horror film, starring Jason Connery, Victoria Pratt, Sid Haig and Ken Foree, directed by Peter Scheerer and Michael Roesch. The movie had its world premiere at the prestigious Sitges Film Festival in Sitges, Spain in October 2007.

For the release in the US and Canada, Sam Raimi´s label Ghosthouse Underground has picked up the movie. It was released on home video in North America through Lionsgate on October 14, 2008.

Plot
Claustrophobic thriller about a team of vampire hunters who infiltrate a nest of undead to rescue one of their own.

Carrie Rieger tugs at her bonds. The young vampire huntress has to free herself. Guarded by vampires, chained in a dark cellar by the mighty vampire King Pashek, her time is running out. She knows an even greater threat than the vampires is coming relentlessly closer. Everything will be decided tonight.

Carrie has crossed a dangerous trail: Back from a faraway journey, a man slowly transforms into a vampire. And he transforms further - into something that even the vampires fear; the mighty vampire demon Vlad Kossei.

The vampire sovereigns killed Kossei many hundreds of years ago, but now he has seemingly returned. In his new body, he will take revenge and destroy everything in his way. There is only one hunter who can stop him...

Cast
Jason Connery as Keaton
Victoria Pratt as Carrie Rieger
Sid Haig as Pashek
Ken Foree as Stanis
William Snow as Thomas
Wes Ramsey as Fork
Jeremy Kissner as Derek
Rachel Grant as Jill
Marc Ian Sklar as Torreck

External links and sources

 
 Brotherhood of Blood at the website of the US distributor Ghost House
 

2007 films
American horror films
2007 horror films
2000s English-language films
2000s American films
2000s German films
English-language German films